Antonio Cañadas Zapata (born 13 June 1979 in San Javier, Murcia) is a Spanish former footballer who played as a midfielder.

References

External links

1979 births
Living people
People from San Javier, Murcia
Spanish footballers
Footballers from the Region of Murcia
Association football midfielders
Segunda División players
Segunda División B players
Tercera División players
Elche CF Ilicitano footballers
Elche CF players
CD Toledo players
CE Sabadell FC footballers
Real Jaén footballers
Alicante CF footballers
Polideportivo Ejido footballers
Real Murcia players
CD Alcoyano footballers
FC Cartagena footballers
Orihuela CF players
CD Eldense footballers